Agou is a town in south-eastern Ivory Coast. It is a sub-prefecture of Adzopé Department in La Mé Region, Lagunes District. Agou is also a commune.

References

Sub-prefectures of La Mé
Communes of La Mé